Different Fortunes is a 1956 Soviet drama film directed by Leonid Lukov.

Plot 
The film tells about young residents of Leningrad, finishing school. Sonia loves Stepu, who is in love with Tanya, and Tanya likes Fedor. Stepa goes to Siberia to study at the evening institute and work in parallel at the local plant. Sonia goes for Stepa and joins the team of the plant where he works. Tanya and Fedor got married and entered the institute, and Fedor, in addition, got a job as a chauffeur in order to bring money to the family. But this was not enough for Tanya, and for the sake of money she began a relationship with a self-sufficient composer.

Cast 
 Tatyana Piletskaya as Tanya Ogneva
 Yulian Panich as Fedya Morozov
 Georgi Yumatov as Styopa Ogurtsov
 Tatyana Konyukhova as Sonya Orlova
 Valentina Ushakova as Vera Zubova
 Lev Sverdlin as Nikolai Kapitonovich, Tanya's father
 Olga Zhizneva as Yelena Semyonovna, Tanya's mother
 Bruno Freindlich as Igor Stepanovich Roshchin, composer
 Sergey Filippov as Kostya, Roshchin's driver
 Vsevolod Sanayev as Vladimir Sergeyevich Zhukov, party organizer
 Sergei Blinnikov as Yegor Petrovich Zubov
 Vladimir Dorofeyev as Ivan Romanovich Sergeychuk
 Anna Kolomiyitseva as Lyudmila Ivanovna, Yegor Zubov's wife
 Liliya Maksimova as Masha, Roshchin's wife
 Vera Orlova as Nina Nikiforovna, Morozov's neighbor
 Muza Krepkogorskaya as Galya, Sonya's neighbor
 Irina Zarubina as Styopa Ogurtsov's aunt

References

External links 
 

1956 films
1950s Russian-language films
Soviet drama films
1956 drama films